Music From and Inspired by the Motion Picture End of Days is the soundtrack to Peter Hyams' 1999 film End of Days. It was released on November 2, 1999 via Geffen Records, and primarily contains tracks by alternative metal and industrial rock bands. It features the first song released by the "new line-up" of Guns N' Roses, the industrial-rock "Oh My God". During End of Days editing, soundtrack songs were overlaid in scenes that are typically silent in thriller films. A sample from Spectrasonics' "Symphony of Voices" is heard in several scenes.

The album peaked at number 16 in Canada and at number 20 in the United States.

Track listing

Chart history

Certifications

References

External links

1999 soundtrack albums
Horror film soundtracks
Geffen Records soundtracks
Albums produced by Butch Vig
Albums produced by DJ Lethal
Albums produced by Fred Durst
Albums produced by Sean Beavan
Albums produced by Toby Wright
Albums produced by Danny Lohner
Albums produced by Scott Humphrey